Laos competed at the 1996 Summer Olympics in Atlanta, United States.

Results by event

Athletics

Women's Marathon
 Sirivanh Ketavong – 3:25.16 (→ 64th place)

References
Official Olympic Reports
sports-reference

Nations at the 1996 Summer Olympics
1996
1996 in Laotian sport